You Dig the Tunnel, I'll Hide the Soil is the debut album by Hatcham Social, released on 16 March 2009 on Fierce Panda Records in the UK and TBD Records in the US.

Track listing
 "Crocodile" (3:04)
 "Sidewalk" (4:26)
 "Murder in the Dark" (2:53)
 "Hypnotise Terrible Eyes" (2:17)
 "So So Happy Making" (2:43)
 "Superman" (2:18)
 "I Cannot Cure My Pure Evil" (2:51)
 "Jabberwocky" (2:20)
 "In My Opinion" (3:12)
 "Penelope (Under My Hat)" (2:39)
 "Give Me the Gift" (4:20)

Notes
Tim Burgess produced all songs apart from "So So Happy Making" which was produced by Faris "Rotter" Badwan of The Horrors.

References

External links
 Fierce Panda Fierce Panda Records
 TBD RECORDS TBD Records

2009 debut albums
Hatcham Social albums
Fierce Panda Records albums